This is a list of magazines that focus on topics related to amateur radio. It is not complete by any means.

Notes and references

 
Amateur radio
Amateur radio-related lists